921 Jovita (prov. designation:  or ) is a dark background asteroid, approximately  in diameter, located in the outer regions of the asteroid belt. It was discovered on 4 September 1919, by astronomer Karl Reinmuth at the Heidelberg-Königstuhl State Observatory in southwest Germany. The carbonaceous C-type asteroid (Ch) has a rotation period of 15.6 hours and is likely spherical in shape. It was named "Jovita", a common German female name unrelated to the discoverer's contemporaries, that was taken from the almanac Lahrer Hinkender Bote.

Orbit and classification 

Jovita is a non-family asteroid of the main belt's background population when applying the hierarchical clustering method to its proper orbital elements. It orbits the Sun in the outer asteroid belt at a distance of 2.6–3.8 AU once every 5 years and 8 months (2,061 days; semi-major axis of 3.17 AU). Its orbit has an eccentricity of 0.18 and an inclination of 16° with respect to the ecliptic. The body's observation arc begins at Heidelberg Observatory on 4 September 1919, the night after its official discovery observation.

Naming 

This minor planet was named "Jovita", after a female name picked from the Lahrer Hinkender Bote, published in Lahr, southern Germany. A Hinkender Bote (lit. "limping messenger") was a very popular almanac, especially in the alemannic-speaking region from the late 17th throughout the early 20th century. The calendar section contains feast days, the dates of important fairs and astronomical ephemerides. The German name day analogue is given next to the protestant and catholic feast days (entry not found).

Reinmuth's calendar names 

As with 22 other asteroids – starting with 913 Otila, and ending with 1144 Oda – Reinmuth selected names from this calendar due to his many asteroid discoveries that he had trouble thinking of proper names. These names are not related to the discoverer's contemporaries. Lutz Schmadel, the author of the Dictionary of Minor Planet Names learned about Reinmuth's source of inspiration from private communications with Dutch astronomer Ingrid van Houten-Groeneveld, who worked as a young astronomer at Heidelberg.

Physical characteristics 

In the Tholen- and SMASS-like taxonomy of the Small Solar System Objects Spectroscopic Survey (S3OS2), Jovita is a hydrated, carbonaceous Caa and Ch-type asteroid, respectively.

Rotation period 

Lightcurve analysis gave a rotation period of  hours with a brightness variation of  magnitude, indicative of a rather spherical shape. A lower rated period determination of  hours with an amplitude of  magnitude was made by French amateur astronomers René Roy and Laurent Bernasconi in September 2004.

Diameter and albedo 

The Collaborative Asteroid Lightcurve Link assumes an albedo of 0.0670 and a diameter of 58.95 km based on an absolute magnitude of 9.7. An asteroid occultation, observed on 5 February 2007, gave a best-fit ellipse dimension of 58.0 × 58.0 kilometers. These timed observations are taken when the asteroid passes in front of a distant star. However the quality of the measurement is rated poorly.

Notes

References

External links 
 Lightcurve Database Query (LCDB), at www.minorplanet.info
 Dictionary of Minor Planet Names, Google books
 Asteroids and comets rotation curves, CdR – Geneva Observatory, Raoul Behrend
 Discovery Circumstances: Numbered Minor Planets (1)-(5000) – Minor Planet Center
 
 

000921
Discoveries by Karl Wilhelm Reinmuth
Named minor planets
19190904